Billy on the Street with Billy Eichner is an American comedy game show hosted by comedian and actor Billy Eichner. During each episode, Eichner goes out to the streets of New York City and asks pedestrians questions about pop culture. Episodes often include guest stars, usually fellow actors or comedians. Recurring games include "For a Dollar" and "Quizzed in the Face." Eichner is also the executive producer and creator of the series.

The series premiered December 18, 2011 on Fuse and aired for three seasons. The fourth season, which premiered on October 8, 2015, and the fifth season, which premiered on November 15, 2016, aired on truTV. It was announced on September 21, 2017, that the show was leaving truTV and was actively searching for a new network. , repeats of the second through fifth seasons are available through HBO Max in the United States and all seasons are available through the truTV app and website in the United States.

The show returned as short-form web episodes distributed by Funny or Die through various digital distribution platforms in September 2018 with Lyft as the presenting sponsor. A few promotional episodes were made in 2022 for Eichner's movie, without Lyft sponsoring.

Episodes

Season 1 (2011–12)

Season 2 (2012–13)

Season 3 (2014)

Season 4 (2015)

Season 5 (2016–17)

Accolades

Russian version 
On the Russian Che channel there started a local version named Begushchy Kosar (lit. The Running Thousand) in which host Alexey Zhirov gives 1000 rubles for the right answer.

References

External links
 Official website
 https://web.archive.org/web/20130216024254/http://www.fuse.tv/shows/billy-on-the-street
 https://www.funnyordie.com/billyonthestreet

2010s American comedy game shows
2011 American television series debuts
2017 American television series endings
TruTV original programming
Television series by Funny or Die
Fuse (TV channel) original programming
Television series based on Internet-based works